Directive 2006/116/EC of the European Parliament and of the Council of 12 December 2006 on the term of protection of copyright and certain related rights (codified version) is a consolidated version of the former EU Directive harmonising the term of copyright protection, including all amendments made up to and including 2006. It replaces the text of the older directive.

References 

Copyright law of the European Union
European Union directives
European Union
2007 in law
2006 in the European Union